Coleophora varensis is a moth of the family Coleophoridae. It is found in France and Spain.

The larvae feed on Carex chaetophylla.

References

varensis
Moths of Europe
Moths described in 1993